Giyan is a district (bakhsh) in Nahavand County, Hamadan Province, Iran. At the 2006 census, its population was 17,253, in 4,304 families.  The District has one city: Giyan.  The District has two rural districts (dehestan): Giyan Rural District and Sarab Rural District.

References 

Nahavand County
Districts of Hamadan Province